Mõtsa Pūol or Metsepole was an ancient Livonian county inhabited by the Finnic Livonians, on the east coast of the Gulf of Riga, at the northwest of what is now the Vidzeme region of Latvia. Metsepole was bordered by the ancient Estonian Sakala County to the north, Latgalian Tālava to the east and Livonian county of Turaida to the south.

During the Livonian Crusade in the beginning of the 13th century, the crusading Livonian Brothers of the Sword led by Albert of Riga began to occupy the shores of the Gulf of Riga. By 1206, Metsepole had been taken over by the crusaders and incorporated into the Bishopric of Riga in 1255.

In 1201, the Bishop Albert von Buxhövden founded the City of Riga as a Christian settlement at the mouth of the river Daugava. When this did not immediately induce the Livonians, Estonians, and Baltic peoples in its hinterland to convert, a knightly order was formed, the Livonian Brothers of the Sword, primarily consisting of Low Germans, to bring salvation to the pagans by force. In a campaign which was a part of the wars known as the Northern Crusades, these knights defeated, subdued and converted the Livonians in 1206 and 1207.

The main centres of Metsepole were located at the hillforts in Skulte, Liepupe and Limbaži.
In 1206, the first Christian priest from Riga, Alexander, arrived in Metsepole. Already in 1207 there was a Christian parish in Metsepole.
In the winter 1210, a crusader army from Riga went through Metsepole to attack Estonian county of Soontagana. It was followed by an Estonian revenge raid in Metsepole and whole region was heavily devastated.
In 1211, Estonians again invaded Metsepole.

See also 

 Archbishopric of Riga
 Eldership of Samogitia
 Lembitu
 Livonian Crusade
 Principality of Kukenois
 Sackalia

References

External links 
 Indriķa hronika. IX. (Latvian)
 Генрих Латвийский Хроника Ливонии (Russian)
 Генрих Латвийский Хроника Ливонии (Russian)
 Teritorijas vēsturiskā attīstība (Latvian)
 Limbažu Rajons (Latvian)
 Mūsu arheoloģiskie novadi (Latvian)

1206 disestablishments
Former countries in Europe
Livonian Crusade
Historical regions in Latvia